Audrey Delph Disbury (5 March 1934 – 17 June 2016) was an English cricketer who played primarily as a right-handed batter. She appeared in 10 Test matches for England between 1957 and 1969, as well as playing in 6 One Day Internationals, as captain, for International XI at the 1973 World Cup. She played domestic cricket for West of England and Kent, and served in the Women's Royal Naval Service.

Early life and naval career
Disbury was born in Bedford and educated at Bedford High School. Her family owned a bakery but after training as a nurse at the Radcliffe Infirmary in Oxford she joined the Women's Royal Naval Service (WRNS). She served as an Air Mechanic with the Fleet Air Arm at Lee-on-Solent before being promoted to Petty Officer and transferring to Chatham Dockyard.

Cricket career
Whilst at Chatham Disbury first played for Kent Women cricket team, making a total of 22 appearances for the county side, eventually serving as captain. She played for a variety of other teams throughout a career which lasted from 1954 to 1976.

She toured Australia, New Zealand and South Africa with England. She played 10 Test matches between 1957/58 and 1968/69 and was the first member of the WRNS to play for the national side. She also made six one-day appearances for the International XI women's cricket team, captaining the team at the 1973 World Cup. She was a "hard hitting" opening batsman and bowled off-breaks. She later served as a Test match selector for England.

Later life
After leaving the WRNS she lived in Ashford and ran a guest house with her partner. She played contract bridge and golf and captained Kent County Golf Association in 1996–1997 and was President of the association between 2012 and 2014. She died at Ashford in June 2016 aged 82. Her brother Brian played county cricket for Kent.

References

External links
 

1934 births
2016 deaths
Sportspeople from Bedford
England women Test cricketers
International XI women One Day International cricketers
International XI women cricket captains
Kent women cricketers
West women cricketers
Military personnel from Bedford
20th-century Royal Navy personnel
Royal Navy sailors